In Canada, the criminal legal system is divided into federal and provincial/territorial jurisdictions. Provincial/territorial correctional facilities hold people who have been sentenced to less than two years in custody and people being held on remand (waiting trial or sentencing).  Federal Correctional Facilities, which are the responsibility of Correctional Service of Canada—is concerned with people who have been sentenced to two years or more in custody.

Provincial/territorial jurisdiction includes: remand for those with a custody sentence of less than two years; community sentences such as fines, community service, or probation; including pre-trial supervision, community and custody sentences, and Extrajudicial Sanctions Programs. Youth criminal legal facilities and sentencing are also provincial/territorial but are usually governed by the ministry responsible for child and youth services, rather than the body responsible for adult corrections. 

Though immigration detention is facilitated by the Canada Border Services Agency, immigration detainees may also be kept in provincial/territorial facilities because either the federal Immigration Holding Centres (IHCs) are full, there is no IHC in their region, or the detainee's file has a link to criminality.

Alberta 
Corrections in Alberta are administered by the Correctional Services of the Ministry of
Justice.
 Calgary Correctional Centre
 Calgary Remand Centre
 Edmonton Remand Centre  — largest in Canada
 Fort Saskatchewan Correctional Centre
 Lethbridge Correctional Centre
 Medicine Hat Remand Centre
 Peace River Correctional Centre
 Red Deer Remand Centre
 Fort Saskatchewan Correctional Centre (3 camps) 
 Metis Nation Wilderness Camp
Alsike Minimum Security Camp (closed April 2009)
 Fort McMurray Minimum Security Camp (closed)
 Kainai Community Correctional Centre

British Columbia 

Corrections in British Columbia are administered by B.C. Corrections under the Ministry of Public Safety and Solicitor General. , BC has 10 correctional centres throughout the province.

Manitoba 
Correctional services in Manitoba are administered by Manitoba Corrections, under the province's Department of Justice.

New Brunswick 

Correctional services in New Brunswick are administered by the Community & Correctional Services of Department of Justice and Public Safety.

Newfoundland and Labrador 
Correctional services in Newfoundland and Labrador are administered by the Corrections and Community Services branch of the Department of Justice and Public Safety.

Nova Scotia 
Corrections in Nova Scotia are administered by the Correctional Services of the province's Department of Justice.

Northwest Territories 

Corrections in the Northwest Territories are administered by the Corrections Service of the territory's Department of Justice.

Nunavut 
Corrections in Nunavut are administered by Nunavut Ministry of Justice.

Ontario 

Adult corrections in Ontario are administered by the Ministry of the Solicitor General, whereas youth detention centres for secure detention of young people ages 12–18 are administered by the Ministry of Children, Community and Social Services.

Prince Edward Island 
Corrections in Prince Edward Island are administered by the Community and Correctional Services Division of the Ministry of Justice and Public Safety and Attorney General.

 Prince County Correctional Centre — Summerside
 Prince Edward Island Youth Centre — Summerside
Provincial Correctional Centre — Charlottetown

Quebec 

Corrections in Quebec are administered by the Direction générale des services correctionnels of the province's Ministry of Public Security (French: Ministère de la Sécurité publique).

Saskatchewan 
Corrections in Saskatchewan are administered by the Ministry of Corrections, Public Safety and Policing.

 Saskatoon Correctional Centre — Saskatoon
 Regina Correctional Centre — Regina
 Prince Albert Correctional Centre — Prince Albert
 Pine Grove Correctional Centre
 Paul Dojack Youth Centre — Regina
 Kilburn Hall — Saskatoon

Yukon 
Corrections in Yukon are administered by the Community and Correctional Services Branch of the Ministry of Justice.

 Whitehorse Correctional Centre — a multi-level 190-inmate facility, for adult males and females, completed in February 2012 and built next to an existing prison building (c. 1967)
 Justice Wellness Centre — Whitehorse

See also 

 List of prisons in Canada
 Incarceration in Canada

References

Correctional_services_in_Canada
Canada
Penal system in Canada
Prisons in Canada
Lists of buildings and structures in Canada
Canada